Khosro Naghed (born 1950 Shiraz, Iran) is a Persian writer, Iranist and linguist.

He has written numerous books and articles on Iranian culture, Persian history, Persian language and literature and philosophy and has influence on Iranian intellectual circles. His articles have appeared in some Iranian newspapers. He wrote a German-Persian dictionary published by Langenscheidt.

Works 
 
 Critique of the Dialectic of Enlightenment. by Khosro Naghed. (Nashreney. Tehran 2019). (book presentation (persian) )
 The Intellectuals and the October Revolution. by Khosro Naghed. (Nashreney. Tehran 2018). (book presentation (persian) )
 East-West dreams. From Gilgamesh's dreams to Nietzsche's nightmares. by Khosro Naghed. (Farhang Moaser publishers. Tehran 2017).
 In Search of the meaning of life. Conversations with European thinkers. selected and translated by Khosro Naghed. (Farhang Moaser publishers. Tehran 2017).
 From Knowledge to Wisdom. Essays and Interviews about philosophy and literature. by Khosro Naghed. (qoqnoos publication. Tehran 2012). (Book Browse )
 Apple and soldier. Poems beyond the horror. re-creation by Khosro Naghed. (Morvarid publication. Tehran 2012). (short review )
 The Praise of Dialogue. Meeting with the Other. by Khosro Naghed. (edition Jahane Ketab. Tehran 2010).
 Utopia and Violence. Essays and Interviews by Karl Popper. Selected and translated by Khosro Naghed and Rahman Afshari. (edition Jahane Ketab. Tehran 2010). (short review )
 Leben trotz Geschichte. Essays und Interviews von Leszek Kolakowski. Ausgewählt und übersetzt von Khosro Naghed. (Edition Jahane Ketab. Tehran 2009)
 Liebesgedichte im Zeitalter der Gewalt. Gedichte von Erich Fried. Übersetzt von Khosro Naghed. Graphiken von Basam Rasam. (Edition Jahane Ketab. Tehran 2008)
 Gedichte für melancholische Tage. Gedichte über Kafkas Stadt. Übersetzt von Khosro Naghed. Graphiken von Basam Rasam. (Edition Jahane Ketab. Tehran 2008)
 Der Tod hat dir nichts zu sagen. Gedichte von Erich Fried. Ausgewählt und übersetzt von Khosro Naghed. (Edition Cheshmeh. Tehran 2007)
 A la sombra de la luna y la muerte. Federico García Lorca. traducción Khosro Naghed. (edición Ketabe Roushan. Tehran 2006).
 Warum Krieg? Albert Einstein, Sigmund Freud. Für einen militanten Pazifismus. Persisch: Khosro Naghed (Edition Roushan. Tehran 2004)
 Langenscheidt Universal-Wörterbuch Persisch. Persisch-Deutsch, Deutsch-Persisch. Von Khosro Naghed (Langenscheidt, Berlin, München 2002)
 L´ impact planetaire de la pensee occidentale et le dialogue de la civilisation. traduction: F. Badreie, B. Parham, Kh. Naghed (édition Frazanrooz Tehran 2000)
 Wie Wasser im Strom, wie Wuestenwind. Gedichte eines Mystikers. Omar Chajjam. Hrsg. von Khosro Naghed. (Zweisprachige Ausgabe, Edition Orient. Berlin 1992.)
 Auf der Schneide des Laechelns. Erich Fried Leben und Gedichte. Zweisprachige Ausgabe. Persisch: Khosro Naghed. (Edition Shahab. Tehran 2000)

See also 
Iranology
Intellectual movements in Iran

External links
Official website

Iranian translators
Iranian Iranologists
Linguists from Iran
People from Shiraz
1950 births
Living people
Persian-language writers
Iranian lexicographers